Paşayiğit is a quarter of the town Keşan in Keşan district of Edirne Province, Turkey. The population of Paşayiğit was 1,427  as of 2012. The name of the town refers to a certain Paşayiğit, a Turkmen leader from Saruhan (present Manisa, Turkey) who captured the town on behalf of the Ottoman Empire in the 14th century. Although Paşayiğit preserved its Greek character up to 20th century,  after the Turkish War of Independence, according to population exchange agreement,  Greek population was replaced by Turkish population from Drama, Greece. Between 1999 and the 2013 reorganisation, it was a town (belde).

References

Populated places in Keşan District